The 1999 Dwars door België was the 54th edition of the Dwars door Vlaanderen cycle race and was held on 24 March 1999. The race started in Kortrijk and finished in Waregem. The race was won by Johan Museeuw.

General classification

References

1999
1999 in road cycling
1999 in Belgian sport
March 1999 sports events in Europe